Alexander Taylor (May 17, 1853 – February 12, 1916) was a Canadian entrepreneur, inventor and politician. He is credited as being one of the founders of the city of Edmonton. Taylor was born in on May 17, 1853, in Ottawa, Ontario, and came to Edmonton in 1877. Shortly after his arrival in Edmonton, Taylor established the first telegraph, telephone, and electricity systems. Taylor asked the Bell Telephone Company to provide services in 1883. Alex Taylor, Dominion Telegraph Agent, brought the first two telephones made of Spanish mahogany, and asked store owner Henry William McKenney of St. Albert to keep the device in St. Albert. Taylor, who, at the time was working for the Dominion Telegraph and Signal Service proposed running a telephone line from his office to St. Albert, Alberta.  January 3, 1885, the two tested the line, the first successful call in Northern Alberta. He founded Edmonton's first telephone company and made Edmonton's first telephone call. In 1892, Taylor installed a switchboard and Jennie Lauder became Edmonton's first telephone operator overseeing a system of 14 telephones. In 1893, the Edmonton District Telephone Company  was granted a charter and less than a decade later it was operational 24 hours a day and provided service to nearby rural areas.

In 1891, Taylor co-founded Edmonton's first electric company, the Edmonton Electric Lighting and Power Company. Taylor also co-founded Edmonton's first newspaper, the Edmonton Bulletin with Frank Oliver in 1880. Taylor also served on the Edmonton Public School Board from 1899 to 1909, and was the chairman of the board in 1907.

In 1904, ill health prompted Taylor to sell his telephone company to the City of Edmonton for $17,000, which later became known as Edmonton Telephones. Taylor died on February 12, 1916. He is buried in the Edmonton Cemetery.

References

1853 births
1916 deaths
Businesspeople from Edmonton
Businesspeople from Ottawa
Alberta school board trustees